The Way You Look Tonight (also released as I Want to Talk About You) is an album by American jazz organist Jimmy McGriff recorded in 1969 and released on the Solid State label the following year.

Track listing
 "The Way You Look Tonight" (Jerome Kern, Dorothy Fields) – 5:27
 "Moon River" (Henry Mancini, Johnny Mercer) – 4:33
 "I Want to Talk About You" (Billy Eckstine) – 5:51
 "Once Again" (Jimmy McGriff) – 5:17
 "Laura" (David Raksin) – 5:33
 "All Soul" (C. Lewis) – 3:41

Personnel
Jimmy McGriff − organ
Unidentified musicians − guitar, drums

References

Solid State Records (jazz label) albums
Jimmy McGriff albums
1970 albums
Albums produced by Sonny Lester